Fairview Park is one of the 39 constituencies in the Yuen Long District of Hong Kong.

The constituency returns one district councillor to the Yuen Long District Council, with an election every four years. Fairview Park constituency is loosely based on Fairview Park, Man Yuen Chuen, Palm Springs, Royal Camellia, Royal Palms and Villa Camellia with estimated population of 20,038.

Councillors represented

Election results

2010s

Notes

References

Yuen Long
Constituencies of Hong Kong
Constituencies of Yuen Long District Council
1991 establishments in Hong Kong
Constituencies established in 1991